Jesse Mahieu (born 12 August 1978) is a Dutch former field hockey player and the current head coach of Hoofdklasse club Pinoké.

Mahieu made a total of 50 appearances for the Netherlands national team from 2002 to 2006. He won the silver medal with the national team at the 2004 Summer Olympics in Athens.

References

External links
 

1978 births
Living people
Dutch male field hockey players
Male field hockey defenders
Olympic field hockey players of the Netherlands
Olympic silver medalists for the Netherlands
Field hockey players at the 2004 Summer Olympics
2006 Men's Hockey World Cup players
People from Best, Netherlands
Olympic medalists in field hockey
Medalists at the 2004 Summer Olympics
Amsterdamsche Hockey & Bandy Club players
NMHC Nijmegen players
Men's Hoofdklasse Hockey players
Dutch field hockey coaches
20th-century Dutch people
21st-century Dutch people
Sportspeople from North Brabant